Mestolobes is a genus of moths of the family Crambidae described by Arthur Gardiner Butler in 1882. All species are endemic to the Hawaiian Islands.

Species
Mestolobes abnormis (Butler, 1882) 
Mestolobes amethystias Meyrick, 1899 
Mestolobes antichora Meyrick, 1904 
Mestolobes aphrias Meyrick, 1899 
Mestolobes arctura Meyrick, 1899 
Mestolobes autodoxa Meyrick, 1899 
Mestolobes banausa Meyrick, 1899 
Mestolobes chimonias Meyrick, 1899 
Mestolobes chlorolychna Meyrick, 1899 
Mestolobes chrysomolybda Meyrick, 1899 
Mestolobes chrysomolybdoides Swezey, 1920 
Mestolobes droseropa Meyrick, 1899 
Mestolobes epidelta Meyrick, 1899 
Mestolobes erinnys Meyrick, 1899 
Mestolobes eurylyca Meyrick, 1899
Mestolobes homalopa Meyrick, 1899
Mestolobes iochrysa Meyrick, 1899
Mestolobes mesacma Meyrick, 1899
Mestolobes minuscula (Butler, 1881)
Mestolobes ochrias Meyrick, 1899 
Mestolobes ombrias Meyrick, 1899 
Mestolobes orthrias Meyrick, 1899 
Mestolobes perixantha Meyrick, 1899 
Mestolobes pessias Meyrick, 1899 
Mestolobes pragmatica Meyrick, 1899
Mestolobes pyropa (Meyrick, 1899)
Mestolobes quadrifascia (Swezey, 1934)
Mestolobes quadrifasciata Swezey, 1920
Mestolobes scleropis Meyrick, 1899
Mestolobes semiochrea Butler, 1882
Mestolobes sicaria Meyrick, 1904
Mestolobes sirina Meyrick, 1899
Mestolobes xanthoscia Meyrick, 1899

References

Natural History Museum Lepidoptera genus database

Crambinae
Endemic moths of Hawaii
Crambidae genera
Taxa named by Arthur Gardiner Butler